The point-snouted racerunner (Eremias acutorostris) is a species of lizard found in east Iran, south Afghanistan and Pakistan .

References

Eremias
Reptiles described in 1887
Taxa named by George Albert Boulenger
Taxobox binomials not recognized by IUCN